John Savage (born February 27, 1965) is an American baseball coach and former pitcher, who currently serves as the head baseball coach for the UCLA Bruins. He played college baseball at Santa Clara for coaches Jerry McClain and John Oldham from 1984 to 1986 before playing in Minor League Baseball (MiLB) for three seasons (1986-1988). After serving as an assistant coach with Nevada and USC in the 1990s, he became the head coach for the UC Irvine Anteaters (2002–04). Savage became UCLA's head baseball coach in July 2004 and has guided the Bruins in that role for the past 18 seasons.

Early career
Before becoming a college baseball coach, Savage played two years with the Cincinnati Reds organization, after three years playing at Santa Clara University. In 1987, he helped the Salt Lake City Trappers set a professional baseball record of 29 consecutive victories.

In 1991, Savage received his bachelor's degree in secondary education from the University of Nevada.

Savage's coaching career started at his alma mater Reno (NV) High School as a pitching coach in 1988. Between 1992 and 2000, Savage served as an assistant coach at Nevada and USC. During this period, his teams won one national championship, played in five regionals and advanced to two NCAA Super Regionals.

Head coaching career

UC Irvine
Savage served as head coach for the UC Irvine Anteaters baseball program from 2002 to 2004. Under him, UC Irvine compiled a record of 88-84-1 (32-34 conference) through three seasons and participated in the South Bend Regional in 2004.

UCLA
Savage has served as UCLA's head baseball coach since the summer of 2004. Savage guided UCLA to its first and only NCAA Championship in baseball in June 2013. While at UCLA, Savage has recorded the most postseason victories of any head coach in program history. In addition, he has seen 23 of his former UCLA players advance to Major League Baseball (since 2005). 

Savage has become one of six college baseball head coaches to have won the College World Series (2013), produced the No. 1 overall selection in the MLB Draft (Gerrit Cole in 2011) and coached the winner of the annual Golden Spikes Award (Trevor Bauer in 2011).

The Bruins' 2019 squad had 13 MLB Draft selections, the largest single-year total of any baseball team in program history.
Savage helped take UCLA to the postseason in 2006, his second year with the program. After the Bruins went 15-41 in 2005, they posted a 33-25 overall record in 2006, advancing to the NCAA Malibu Regional, where they went 1-2 with an opening game victory over UC Irvine. In 2007, his third year at UCLA, Savage steered the Bruins to their first NCAA Super Regional appearance since 2000. The Bruins went 33-28 overall, securing a No. 2 seed in NCAA Regional action at Long Beach State. UCLA's team swept the Long Beach Regional with wins over Pepperdine, Illinois-Chicago and Long Beach State, but lost the Super Regional to Cal State Fullerton.

UCLA's 2008 squad advanced to the NCAA Tournament, marking the first time in program history that the Bruins had earned three consecutive trips to the NCAA Tournament. The Bruins were ranked No. 1 in the preseason Baseball America poll  that year. During the regular season, UCLA played 18 games against teams ranked in Baseball America's weekly top-25 poll. Savage helped lead the Bruins to series victories in three of the team's four Pac-10 road series.

In 2010, Savage's team advanced to the College World Series by defeating the defending National Champion LSU Tigers in the Los Angeles Regional and the Cal State Fullerton Titans in the Los Angeles Super Regional. The Bruins finished the season in second place, losing two games to the South Carolina Gamecocks in the Championship Series. He was named the National Coach of the Year by CollegeBaseballInsider.com in 2010. He was also named 2010 NCAA Division I Western Regional Coach of the Year  by the American Baseball Coaches Association (ABCA).

In 2011, UCLA again returned to postseason play, backed by the strong pitching of Gerrit Cole, Trevor Bauer and freshman Adam Plutko. The Bruins compiled a 35-24 overall record and won the Pac-10 Conference with an 18-9 mark in league play.

In 2012, he led UCLA to the College World Series by defeating TCU in the Los Angeles Super Regional. The Bruins went 1-2 in their trip to the College World Series, defeating Stony Brook before dropping consecutive games to Arizona and Florida State in the second round.

In 2013, he guided UCLA to the College World Series by defeating Cal State Fullerton in the Super Regional. This was the team's third appearance in the College World Series in four years. The team defeated No. 1-seed North Carolina (4–1) to advance to the Championship series where they beat Mississippi State to win the NCAA national title. Savage was named the National Coach of the Year by Collegiate Baseball Newspaper and Baseball America, and the ABCA West Region Coach of the Year. After winning the first national CWS championship, Savage agreed to extend his contract with UCLA to 2025 with an increase in salary.

In 2015, Savage guided the Bruins back to postseason play, earning the No. 1 overall seed in the NCAA Tournament. UCLA hosted the NCAA Los Angeles Regional at Jackie Robinson Stadium, but was eliminated in regional play. UCLA's 2015 squad finished the season with an overall record of 45-16.

In 2017, UCLA went 30-27 en route to the NCAA Long Beach Regional.

In 2018, Savage guided the Bruins to a 38-21 overall record and a 19-11 mark in Pac-12 play. UCLA ranked sixth in the nation in team ERA and was seventh in WHIP. The Bruins were just one of two teams, nationally, to rank among the top 10 in both ERA and team fielding percentage.

In 2019, Savage earned Pac-12 Coach of the Year and ABCA West Region Coach of the Year honors after leading the Bruins to one of the most successful seasons in program history. UCLA went 52-11 (setting a school record for wins), claimed the Pac-12 title, spent a program-record 12 consecutive weeks atop the national rankings, and earned the No. 1 overall seed in the NCAA Tournament for the second time ever. UCLA won all 14 of its regular-season series, a first in program history.

Savage picked up a pair of milestone wins during the 2019 season, earning his 500th career victory at UCLA after a Friday night win against Oregon State (March 15). He notched career win No. 600 when the Bruins defeated East Carolina (April 12). Savage managed a pitching staff that led the NCAA in team ERA (2.60). No other team finished with an ERA under 3.00 and only one team logged an ERA within one half-run of UCLA. The Bruins also paced the nation in shutouts (throwing a program-record 11), hits allowed per nine innings (6.18), and WHIP (1.05) while ranking in the top-10 in strikeout-to-walk ratio (3.13, fourth) and strikeouts per nine innings (10.2, seventh). Junior right-hander Ryan Garcia (10-1, 1.44 ERA) was named the Pac-12 Pitcher of the Year and a consensus first team All-America selection. Sophomore closer Holden Powell (17 saves, 1.84 ERA) was dubbed the NCBWA Stopper of the Year. A program-record 13 Bruins were selected in the 2019 MLB First-Year Player Draft, including Michael Toglia (23rd overall, Colorado) who became UCLA's first position player to be picked in the first round since Chase Utley in 2000. UCLA had the most day one picks of any NCAA team, and finished tied with Vanderbilt for the most selections overall.

In 2020, the Bruins opened the season with a 13-2 overall record. UCLA won its first 11 games of the season and had gone 13-2 before the season was suspended due to the outbreak of a global pandemic. The season was not resumed, postseason play was canceled, and UCLA concluded its abbreviated baseball season with 13 wins in 15 games. Under Savage's direction, UCLA's pitching staff had compiled a 1.88 ERA. The Bruins' offense had batted .308 through 15 games.

In 2021, the Bruins earned their fourth consecutive postseason appearance, advancing to the NCAA Regional at Texas Tech. UCLA defeated Army and North Carolina in the elimination bracket to advance to the NCAA Regional Final, closing the season with a 37-20 record and an 18-12 mark in the Pac-12. JT Schwartz finished the season as the Pac-12 Conference’s regular-season batting champion (.396 average), joining five other Bruins on the All-Pac-12 Team. The Bruins' pitching staff finished among the top three schools in the Pac-12 in team ERA (3.95) and strikeouts per nine innings (9.39). UCLA's program had a nation-leading 10 players selected in the 2021 MLB Draft, including first-round pick Matt McClain (Cincinnati Reds). Two players – JT Schwartz and Nick Nastrini – were chosen in the fourth round of the MLB Draft.

In 2022, UCLA compiled a 40-24 overall record and advanced to the NCAA Regional at Auburn. After finishing in third place in the Pac-12 standings, the Bruins overcame a loss to Florida State in the regional opener with wins against Southeastern Louisiana and Florida State in the elimination bracket. The Bruins came up short in the championship portion of the NCAA Regional, losing to top-seeded Auburn. Four of UCLA's freshmen secured Freshman All-America honors from Collegiate Baseball, and two of those individuals were honored as Freshman All-America selections by the NCBWA. UCLA had six players selected to the year-end All-Pac-12 team, including pitchers Max Rajcic, Alonzo Tredwell and Ethan Flanagan, along with catcher Darius Perry, shortstop Cody Schrier and first baseman Jake Palmer.

Record

}}

First-Round Draft selections
While at UCLA, Savage has coached eight players who have been selected in the MLB Draft's first round (includes first-round compensation selections).

 David Huff (39th overall, Cleveland Indians, 2006 MLB Draft)
 Gerrit Cole (1st overall, Pittsburgh Pirates, 2011 MLB Draft)
 Trevor Bauer (3rd overall, Arizona Diamondbacks, 2011 MLB Draft)
 Jeff Gelalich (57th overall, Cincinnati Reds, 2012 MLB Draft)
 James Kaprielian (16th overall, New York Yankees, 2015 MLB Draft)
 Michael Toglia (23rd overall, Colorado Rockies, 2019 MLB Draft)
 Garrett Mitchell (20th overall, Milwaukee Brewers, 2020 MLB Draft)
Matt McClain (17th overall, Cincinnati Reds, 2021 MLB Draft)

USA Collegiate National team
Savage served as the manager for USA Baseball's Collegiate National Team in the summer of 2017. He led the U.S. team to a 15-5 record that summer, including an 11-4 mark during international play. The United States won all three international series in which it competed, going 4-0 against Chinese Taipei and 3-2 versus both Cuba and Japan. The win over Cuba marked the third consecutive series win for the United States.

Personal
John Savage is from Reno, Nevada where he grew up with two brothers, Len and Pete. He attended Reno High School, where he was a record-setting right-handed pitcher. Savage and his wife, Lisa, have four children: Julia, Jack, Ryan and Gabrielle. He is also the son-in-law of former Nevada Wolf Pack football coach Chris Ault. Savage was inducted into Reno High School's Athletic Hall of Fame in 1997.

See also
List of current NCAA Division I baseball coaches

References

External links

 Official UCLA Profile

1965 births
Living people
Nevada Wolf Pack baseball coaches
Santa Clara Broncos baseball players
University of Nevada, Reno alumni
UC Irvine Anteaters baseball coaches
UCLA Bruins baseball coaches
USC Trojans baseball coaches
Reno High School alumni
Baseball coaches from Nevada
Sportspeople from Reno, Nevada
Billings Mustangs players
Boise Hawks players
Reno Silver Sox players
Salt Lake City Trappers players